Rahim Yar Khan is a city in Punjab province of Pakistan. It is the 9th largest city of Pakistan by population. It is the capital of the Rahim Yar Khan District and Rahim Yar Khan Tehsil. The administration of the city is subdivided into nine Union Councils.

History

It has been renamed several times over the last 5,000 years. The earliest recorded name was AROR or ALOR, and then it became City of Pattan, Phul Wada, Noshehra and now Rahim Yar Khan. The ancient tower of Pattan Minarah stands 13 km to the south of the city center in its original form. Ummayads led by Muhammad Bin Qasim conquered the key cities of Uch and Multan after conquest of Sindh. After that Arabs ruled the vast areas of Punjab including Rahim Yar Khan region.

Rahim Yar Khan region was part of Multan province of Mughal Empire. In 1881, Nawab of Bahawalpur gave the city its current name by naming it after his first-born son and crown prince Rahim Yar Khan.

Rahim Yar Khan has had the status of a separate district since 1943. The district derives its name from its headquarters, the city of Rahim Yar Khan, which was known as "Naushehra" until 1881. To avoid confusion with the similarly named city of Nowshera, the ruler of Bahawalpur, Nawab Sadiq Khan IV, renamed it after his first son, Rahim Yar Khan.

Demographics
The population of city in 1998 was 233,537, but according to the 2017 Census of Pakistan, the population rose to 477,110 with a growth of about 104.4% in 19 years. According to worldometer, this population has increased to 788,815.

Education

Litercy rate of Rahim Yar Khan 
The literacy rate for persons 15 years or older in the city is 78.6%.

Universities and colleges
Khawaja Fareed University of Engineering and Information Technology
Shaikh Zayed Medical College and Hospital
Islamia University of Bahawalpur, RYK campus
Punjab Group of Colleges
Army Public School and College
National College of Business Administration and Economics
 RYK.IBA college

Schools 
 Radiantway Grammar School
 Beaconhouse School System
 Lahore Grammar School
 Oxbridge Secondary School
 Sheikh Zaid Public School
 The City School
 IIUI Schools RYK Campus
 Star Schools of Sciences
 MTB Schools and Colleges
 National Garrission Cadet School
 Holy Cross Catholic High School
 Al-Muslim Schools and Girls 
College
 Al Shoaib Grammar School
 Al Meezan Schools
 Punjab Daanish School (Boys/Girls) Rahim Yar Khan
 NIMS School System
 Moazzam-Ur-Rehman Public School

Pre-schools 
 Oxbridge Pre Schools
 EDUCATE Pre School 
 New Day School

Madrassas 
 Madrassa Al Khair, First Class Madrassa

Academies 
 KIPS Academy
 Star Academy
 A-One Academy
 The Standard Academy of Science
 Inspire Academy 
 M Academy
 Punjab Academy
 Iqra Academy
 AAK Academy

Transport

Air
Shaikh Zayed International Airport is located in Rahim Yar Khan. It serves the people of city with domestic and international flights. There are daily flight from this airport to Karachi, twice in a week to/from Lahore, and once a week to Islamabad.

Rail

Rahim Yar Khan is connected with rest of the country by rail. The Rahim Yar Khan railway station is a major railway station of Pakistan Railways on the Karachi-Peshawar Railway Line.

Notable people 
Aima Baig, singer
Shafqat Mahmood, politician 
Muniba Mazari, activist
Talha Chahour, actor
Saima Akram Chaudhry, pakistani screenwriter
Asim Saleem Bajwa, Lieutenant general (Pakistan)
Abdullah Darkhawasti, Pakistani Sunni Islamic scholar
Fida-Ur-Rehman Darkhawasti, Pakistani Islamic scholar, academic and politician

References 

Bahawalpur Division
Cities in Punjab (Pakistan)
Populated places in Rahim Yar Khan District
Populated places in Punjab, Pakistan
Rahim Yar Khan District